Mastigoproctus giganteus, the giant whip scorpion, also called the giant vinegaroon or grampus, is a species of whip scorpions in the family Thelyphonidae.

Description
They have six legs used for movement, two long antenniform front legs that they use to feel around for prey and detect vibrations, and two large pedipalps modified into claws that they use to crush their prey. They have a long, thin, whip-like tail, the origin of the common name whipscorpion. From the base of this tail they can spray a substance composed of 85% acetic acid in order to defend themselves. Acetic acid is the main component of vinegar, so the spray smells strongly of vinegar, leading to the common name "vinegaroon".

Mastigoproctus giganteus have eight eyes: two in a pair on the front of the head and three on each side of the head. These eyes are very weak, so Mastigoproctus giganteus navigates mostly by feeling with its long front legs, tail, and pedipalps.

Phylogeny
Mastigoproctus giganteus is included with the Tetrapulmonata in a clade within the pulmonate Arachnida (those with book lungs), most closely related to spiders Araneae and stinging scorpions Scorpiones, which they feed on. It is composed of the extant orders Uropygi (Thelyphonida, whip scorpions), Schizomida (short-tailed whip scorpions), Amblypygi (tail-less whip scorpions) and Araneae (spiders) This 2019 cladogram summarizes:

Pedipalpi is further classified.  The Schizomida and Uropygi likely diverged in the late Carboniferous, somewhere in the tropics of Pangaea.

Habitat
Mastigoproctus giganteus lives in the southern US and in Mexico at elevations up to 6000 feet. It preys on various insects, worms, and slugs. It is an efficient predator that feeds at night on a variety of Arthropods, primarily insects such as cockroaches and crickets, as well as millipedes and other arachnids. It has even been recorded feeding on small frogs and toads. It uses its large pedipalps to hold prey, while the chelicerae tear and bite the prey.

Mastigoproctus giganteus is the only species of family Thelyphonidae that occurs in the United States,  including  Arizona, Florida, New Mexico, Oklahoma, and Texas.

Vinegaroons are efficient predators of scorpions and are sometimes acquired for that purpose. Mastigoproctus giganteus may be eaten by raccoons, coatis, armadillos, skunks, bears, hogs and peccaries, ground birds such as roadrunners, lizards, and tarantulas.

Life cycle and reproduction
Mastigoproctus giganteus typically lives 4 to 7 years, but the female reproduces only once, producing about 40 offspring which she protects and feeds in their early lives.

Males fight each other at night in fierce battles for the privilege of mating with a female also at night.

Survivability of young is improved by continual care by the mother.

Economic impact
Mastigoproctus giganteus is regarded as beneficial to agriculture and human residences by controlling stinging scorpions, insects, and spider populations.

As pets
This species is sold in the exotic animal trade as pets.

Non venomous they can be kept as individual adults or groups of juveniles in terrariums with places to dig and hide, fed insects twice a week especially crickets and flies. Mastigoproctus giganteus can be handled gently with care to avoid being bitten, pinched, or sprayed with acid when the arachnid feels threatened.

Subspecies
 Mastigoproctus giganteus giganteus (Lucas, 1835) — Southern USA
 Mastigoproctus giganteus excubitor (Girard, 1854) — University Of Florida
 Mastigoproctus giganteus rufus mexicanus (Butler, 1872) — Mexico
 Mastigoproctus giganteus giganteus (Lonnberg, 1879) — Florida to Arizona
 Mastigoproctus giganteus scabrosus (Pocock, 1902) — Mexico
  Four subspecies A, B, C, and D are under study in The American Museum of Natural History, New York City and The National Autonomous University of Mexico.

References

Uropygi
Arachnids of North America
Arthropods of Mexico
Arthropods of the United States
Animals described in 1835